The 2013–14 Liga Nacional de Hockey Hielo season was the 40th season of the Liga Nacional de Hockey Hielo, the top level of ice hockey in Spain. Six teams participated in the league, and CD Hielo Bipolo won the championship.

Teams

Regular season standings

Playoffs

Semifinals

1st leg

2nd leg

3rd leg

Final

1st leg

2nd leg

3rd leg

4th leg

External links 
Federación Española de Deportes de Hielo

Spain
Liga Nacional de Hockey Hielo seasons
Liga